Lavinho Thomas Pinto (23 October 1929 – 15 February 2020) was an Indian sprinter.  He won two gold medals in the first Asian Games held in New Delhi in 1951 for the 100 and 200 metre sprints. He also competed in the 1952 Summer Olympics. Pinto later immigrated to the United States, settling in Chicago. He died there in 2020 at the age of 90.

Competition record

References

External links
 

1929 births
2020 deaths
Sportspeople from Nairobi
Indian male sprinters
Olympic athletes of India
Athletes (track and field) at the 1952 Summer Olympics
Asian Games medalists in athletics (track and field)
Athletes (track and field) at the 1951 Asian Games
Asian Games gold medalists for India
Asian Games silver medalists for India
Medalists at the 1951 Asian Games